Robert Pollak may refer to:

 Robert A. Pollak (economist) (born 1938), American economist
  (1880–1962), Austrian violinist who worked in Japan and the United States; see